Saetotaenia is a genus of moths belonging to the family Tortricidae. It contains only one species, Saetotaenia velitans, which is found in Brazil.

The wingspan is about 15 mm. The forewings are whitish, with a dark reddish-fuscous costal fold. The edge of the basal patch is indicated by a blackish spot on the fold connected with the costa by a very fine blackish curved line enlarged into a small mark above the middle. There is some crimson and grey irroration towards the dorsum beneath and beyond this. The hindwings are ochreous-whitish with a few grey strigulae towards the apex.

See also
List of Tortricidae genera

References

External links
tortricidae.com

Archipini
Monotypic moth genera
Taxa named by Józef Razowski
Tortricidae genera